The 1916 Wabash Little Giants football team represented the Wabash College during the 1916 college football season. Under 2nd year head coach Paul Sheeks, the Little Giants compiled 7–2 record, and outscored their opponents by a total of 241 to 123.

Schedule

References

Wabash
Wabash Little Giants football seasons
Wabash Little Giants football